Buckmaster & Moore (B&M) was a London stockbroker established in 1895 and acquired by Credit Suisse Group in 1987.

History 
Charles Armytage-Moore and Walter Selby Buckmaster were founding partners of a London firm of stockbrokers, Buckmaster and Moore. Buckmaster had been admitted to the Stock Exchange in 1895, and traded with other partners including Douglas Lyon Holms, Harry Walter Franklin and later Charles James Eglantine Armytage Moore who was admitted in 1903. The partnership between Buckmaster and Moore started around 1905.The others, Holms and Franklin, dissolved their partnership in 1908.

Both men had been pupils at Repton School, and both excelled as sportsmen. Buckmaster, whilst at Trinity College, Cambridge became Captain of the polo team. He developed into one of the country’s leading Polo players, winning silver medals in the 1900 and 1908 Olympic Games.  He was also a member of the winning team in the International Polo Cup, in 1902. Through his aunt, Maria Sarah Buckmaster (Mrs Alfred Whitehead) he was cousin to Alfred North Whitehead, the renowned mathematician and philosopher.

Moore had joined the Marylebone Cricket Club and played against Hertfordshire in 1904. He was related - through his eldest sister Pricilla, to Hugh Annesley, 5th Earl Annesley in 1892, a British military officer and Member of Parliament for County Cavan, living in Castlewellan Castle, in County Down. 

As stockbrokers they had developed a good private client business, and were very well connected. They had London offices at 64 Cornhill, EC3 and later 52, Bishopsgate, EC2A. Their Perfined Contract Revenue Stamp identity mark was B&M.

One of their partners, Oswald Toynbee ‘foxy’ Falk (1879–1972), had attended Rugby School, then Balliol College, Oxford (as an exhibitioner), where his uncle the social philosopher and historian, Arnold Toynbee, once taught. Joining the firm after leaving the Treasury, he began to develop a new view on economics.
An earlier partner Francis James Rennell Rodd, Francis Rodd, 2nd Baron Rennell served in the artillery and as an intelligence officer during the First World War, where he befriended T. E. Lawrence triggering his passion for exploring desert landscapes. He entered the Diplomatic Service in 1919 resigning in 1924, joining the Bank of England and becoming a partner of B&M, resigning in 1929. He became managing director of Morgan, Grenfell & Co.

Another partner was Maurice Bonham-Carter an English Liberal politician, civil servant and first-class cricketer. He was H. H. Asquith's Principal Private Secretary during Asquith's time as Prime Minister from 1910 to 1916 and later served in other government posts. He played cricket for Oxford University Cricket Club in the early 20th century. The actress Helena Bonham Carter is his granddaughter.

John Maynard Keynes (1883-1946) one of the firm’s clients (also Bursar of King's College, Cambridge), joined with Falk to form a syndicate to speculate in currency movements. Keynes lost his fortune in 1920 with money borrowed from both his father and Falk. OT Falk eventually became a senior partner. He went on to write many financial papers and books which are studied today in Business Schools. Another partner, Maurice Bonham Carter (1880–1960) was also a Balliol graduate, and sportsman. In addition, he served as the Principal Private Secretary to the politician H. H. Asquith and became a leading figure in the Liberal Party (UK).

At one time in the late 1920s the firm employed the young Francis Pakenham, later Frank Pakenham, 7th Earl of Longford, as well as the young Oxford mathematician J. H. C. Whitehead. Both of which, for different reasons decided the City was not the life for them.

Buckmaster lived at Moreton Manor, Moreton Morrell and was Master of the Warwickshire Foxhounds. He married Ida Sarah Blyth in 1896, they had two daughters who never married. He in died on 30 October 1942 at Warwick Hospital. Moore lived at Winterfold House in Surrey, married Celine Marie Pappa in 1917, daughter of a Greek born stockbroker, and died in December 1960. They had no children and Celine died in 1970.

The firm was eventually taken over by Credit Suisse Group in 1987. Buckmaster & Moore was renamed and reorganised into broking and fund management operations. The company was dissolved in November 1996.

List of partners in February 1932 
OSWALD T. FALK, WALTER S. BUCKMASTER, C. J. E. ARMYTAGE MOORE, IAN MACPHERSON, ARTHUR J. BEAMISH, MAURICE BONHAM-CARTER, J. R. RALLI, R. N. M. MURRAY.

Recollections of B&M in the 1970s 
James Michael (Mike) Anson Shemilt (1939-2015)
I eventually ended up in the 1970s as a partner in a medium sized (some 50 partners) firm of stockbrokers named Buckmaster & Moore. The firm was perhaps at that time the largest manager of discretionary funds under management in the City. It was still quite novel then to have discretion over the management of a clients money, the norm being that one had to refer to clients for permission before buying & selling shares on their behalf. B & M, driven by its forceful senior partner, Ian Macpherson, had extended this principle to institutional funds as well as private individuals so that at that time the entire portfolios of a number of Cambridge colleges, the Church in Wales & the Provincial Insurance Company among many others (including of course private individuals) were run by B & M on a totally discretionary basis. This put the firm in a very powerful position.
Shortly after I joined B & M there was a bloodless revolution in which the ageing Ian Macpherson was sidelined and a group of younger partners took over the firm and it was decided to expand by attempting to develop a parallel business of selling research ideas to the big institutions in return for large buy and sell orders, whilst retaining and hopefully increasing the investment management side. There was a wind of change in the City. More sophisticated investment & financial vehicles were being introduced and the class system was breaking down with talented people being promoted regardless of their background. This was a welcome change, and a whole raft of new partners were brought in at B & M (including myself). We were a mixed bunch of young men from all levels of the social scale.

Recollections of B&M in the 1980s 
Marcus Padley (1961-) an English-born stockbroker and writer, currently resides in Melbourne, Australia.

Thirty years ago I was employed by Buckmaster & Moore, an English stockbroker, and was attending my first ever morning meeting in their offices at Bishopsgate EC2 (before it was redeveloped). The firm had been founded about 1900 by the captain of the Cambridge polo team and Olympic polo player, Walter Buckmaster, and some Irish bloke from Repton whose father-in-law was a stockbroker.
In 1982 brokers had to get to work so early in the morning (8.30am) that every firm offered its employees a full silver service cooked breakfast before the 9.30am meeting. The partners had a butler who served theirs in the boardroom. We had to get our own from the buffet table and eat it at 'the long' table.
Only partners were allowed to smoke cigars or drink spirits in the morning meeting (cigarettes were OK). Everyone smoked. Ashtrays were built into the desks. Everybody drank. Beaujolais Nouveau cost the industry a day of productivity a year, if not two. On my first day I drank five pints at lunchtime. Of Pimm's.
People slept in the toilets and everyone carried a piece of paper with their address in their suit top pocket, so the taxi drivers knew where to take you when you passed out in the back of the cab. Share prices were displayed on one massive TV screen (28-inch) that sat next to the senior partner's desk. An active stock price would change maybe five times a day. Most didn't change. A four-point move on the FT All Share FTSE All-Share Index was a volatile day. 
Prices were updated by stock exchange orange buttons who, if they could be bothered, would walk around the stock exchange floor and ask jobbers if anything had changed. The jobbers Stockjobber would create trade by pretending they had. Not a lot of prices changed after lunch.

References

Sources 
 Cricket Archive (C Armytage Moore) MCC: 
 R F Harrod, The Life of John Maynard Keynes, London, Macmillan, 1951
 O.T. Falk: (Keynes’s model economist?), Alex Millmow, School of Business, Ballarat, Australia (Working Paper Series:001 – 2011) 
 The London Gazette, 2 April 1926: Buckmaster & Moore Partnership Notice 
 The London Gazette, 26 March 1929: Buckmaster & Moore Partnership Notice 
 The London Gazette, 16 February 1932: Buckmaster & Moore Partnership Notice 
 The Foreign Exchange Market of London: Development Since 1900, John Atkin, Routledge, 2005

Links 
  Companycheck.co.uk:  Buckmaster & Moore

Defunct financial services companies of the United Kingdom
Brokerage firms
British stockbrokers
Defunct companies based in London
Financial services companies based in London
British companies established in 1895
Financial services companies established in 1895
British companies disestablished in 1987
1895 establishments in England
1987 disestablishments in England